Grier is a surname, and may refer to:

People surnamed Grier
 Anfernee Grier, baseball player
 Bobby Grier (Pittsburgh Panthers) (fl. 1950s), American college football player who broke color barrier
 David Grier, musician
 David Alan Grier (born 1955), American actor
 David Alan Grier (writer), American writer on technology and social policy
 Eliza Ann Grier (1864–1902), African-American physician
 Francis Grier (born 1955), British composer
 Hayes Grier, (born 2000), American Vine celebrity
 Mike Grier (born 1975), American hockey player
 Nash Grier (born 1997), American Vine celebrity
 Pam Grier (born 1949), American actor
 Robert Cooper Grier (1794–1870), American jurist
 Rosey Grier (born 1932), American football player
 Ruth Grier (fl. 1980s), Canadian politician
 Terry Grier (born 1936), Canadian politician
 Vincent Grier (born 1983) basketball player
 Will Grier (born 1995), American football player; older brother of Hayes and Nash

See also 
 Grierson (disambiguation)
 Greer (disambiguation)